Józef Lejtes (1901–1983) was a Polish screenwriter and film director. He later worked in Israel and the United States.

Selected filmography
Poland:
 Huragan (1928)
 Z dnia na dzień (1929)
 Dzikie pola (1932)
 Pod Twoją obronę (1933)
 Młody las (1934)
 Córka generała Pankratowa (1934)
 Dzień wielkiej przygody (1935)
 Barbara Radziwiłłówna (1936)
 Róża (1936)
 Granica (1938)
 Sygnały (1938)
 Kościuszko pod Racławicami (1938)
 Od Latrum do Gazali (1942)
Israel:
 My Father's House (1947)
 Wielka obietnica (1947)
 Nie ma wyboru (1949)
 Ein Breira (1949)
United States:
 The Faithful City (1952)
 Krzywda i zemsta (1954)
 Passion (1954)
 Dolina tajemnicy (1967)
 The Counterfeit Killer (1968)

Bibliography
 Skaff, Sheila. The Law of the Looking Glass: Cinema in Poland, 1896-1939. Ohio University Press, 2008.

External links

1901 births
1983 deaths
Polish film directors
Film people from Warsaw
20th-century Polish screenwriters
Male screenwriters
20th-century Polish male writers